It's a Good Life is the seventh studio album by The Northern Pikes released in 2003.  Like their previous studio album, it was released independently.

The first single from the album was "It's a Good Life" in 2003, followed by "Underwater" in 2004. A promotional video was also made for "Underwater", the band's first since "Everything" in 1993.

The album ends with the song "Blame The Song" which is a tongue-in-cheek tune about the power of a hit song. Not only is the song credited to all four members of the band (a rarity for them), but the lyrics refer to the specific band members in the second last verse (sung by Bryan Potvin): "Jay and Merl drinkin' margaritas/Donnie's in the kitchen cookin' chicken fajitas/I'm sittin' here swattin' West Nile mosquitos/Blame the Song" and the final verse refers specifically to their career: "The Things I Do For Money/I'll never understand/Why I'm 40 years old and still playin' in this band/I guess it's got somethin' to do with 'Teenland'/Blame the Song". The band's first hit in Canada was "Teenland" which was followed by another hit called "The Things I Do For Money".

Track listing

"It's A Good Life" (Jay Semko)
"Don't Hate Me" (Bryan Potvin)
"Underwater" (Merl Bryck)
"Foolish Pride" (Potvin)
"End Of Our Year" (Bryck, Potvin, Semko)
"Dandelions" (Semko)
"Innocence Hides From You" (Potvin)
"Tomorrow" (Semko)
"Swim Into The Rhythm" (Bryck)
"Blame The Song" (Bryck, Potvin, Schmid, Semko)

Album credits

Personnel
Jay Semko - vocals, bass
Merl Bryck - vocals, guitar
Bryan Potvin - vocals, guitar
Don Schmid - drums, percussion

Additional Personnel
Ross Nykiforuk - keyboards

Production
The Northern Pikes and Ross Nykiforuk - producers
Ross Nykiforuk - engineer and mixer
Peter Moore - Mastering at The E Room, Toronto

References

2003 albums
The Northern Pikes albums